The 2020 Gibraltar Open (officially the 2020 BetVictor Gibraltar Open) was a professional snooker tournament that took place from 13 to 15 March 2020 at the Europa Point Sports Complex in Gibraltar with qualifying rounds occurring on 11 and 12 March 2020. It was the fifteenth ranking event of the 2019–20 snooker season, and the final tournament in the European Series, following the German Masters, European Masters and Snooker Shoot Out. The event was the fifth Gibraltar Open tournament, first held in 2015. The event was organized by the World Professional Billiards and Snooker Association and sponsored by BetVictor. 

Due to the COVID-19 pandemic, matches were originally limited to a maximum audience of 100. After the first day, all matches were played without any spectators. A number of professional players withdrew from the event, alongside 54 amateur players and a series of referees; in some cases matches were played between players without referees.

The defending champion was Stuart Bingham who defeated Ryan Day 4–1 in the 2019 final. Bingham lost 0–4 to Ben Woollaston in the third round of the event. Judd Trump won the championship – his 17th career and sixth ranking title of the season – after a 4–3 defeat of Kyren Wilson in the final. Winning six events became the record for the most ranking titles in a season with the victory. The tournament featured a total of £251,000 with the winner receiving £50,000. In addition to the winners purse, Trump also secured £150,000 for scoring the most ranking points across the European Series. There was a total of 63 century breaks made during the event, the highest of which a 144 made by Trump in frame three of the final against Wilson.

Tournament format
The event was the fifth iteration of the Gibraltar Open, having been first held in 2015. It took place from 13 to 15 March 2020 at the Europa Point Sports Complex in Gibraltar. The event was the 15th ranking tournament of the 2019–20 snooker season after the Players Championship, and preceding the Tour Championship. The defending champion was Stuart Bingham who had defeated Ryan Day 4–1 in the 2019 final. The Gibraltar Open was the final event of the 2020 BetVictor European Series, following the 2020 European Masters, 2020 German Masters and 2020 Snooker Shoot Out. The tournament was organised by the World Professional Billiards and Snooker Association and sponsored by BetVictor.  Qualifying for the event was held from 11 to 12 March 2020 also at the Europa Point Sports Complex. Qualifying was played as best-of-5  matches, with the main stage of the event played as best-of-7 frames.

Due to the COVID-19 pandemic, matches were originally limited to a maximum audience of 100. After the first day, this restriction was tightened and matches were played without crowds.  As a number of tour referees were unable to travel to the venue as a result of the pandemic, some matches were played without referees, with players  balls for their opponents. The event was broadcast by Eurosport across Europe.

Prize fund
The event featured a total prize fund of £251,000 with the winner receiving £50,000. This was an increase of £74,000 and £25,000 respectively from the 2019 event. As part of the BetVictor European Series the player with the highest amount of prize money received from the four events won an additional £150,000. Prior to the event, only Neil Robertson and Judd Trump were in contention for the prize.

The breakdown of prize money for this year is shown below:

 Winner: £50,000
 Runner-up: £20,000
 Semi-final: £6,000
 Quarter-final: £5,000
 Last 16: £4,000
 Last 32: £3,000
 Last 64: £2,000
 Highest break: £5,000
 Total: £251,000

Summary
Due to the COVID-19 pandemic several players withdrew from the event; Neil Robertson, John Higgins, Mark Allen, David Gilbert, Stephen Maguire, Ali Carter, Graeme Dott, Noppon Saengkham, Kurt Maflin, Anthony Hamilton, Mike Dunn, Fraser Patrick and Jimmy White, with some being replaced in the draw by amateur players.

The first three rounds of the event were played on 13 and 14 March 2020. Ben Woollaston defeated reigning Masters champion Stuart Bingham at the last 32 stage. Woollaston made  of 79 and 74 and eventually whitewashed Bingham 4–0. Thepchaiya Un-Nooh won his last 32 stage match 4–0 over Harvey Chandler in just 43 minutes. Three-time world champion Mark Williams defeated Martin Gould, but Mark Selby was defeated by Lyu Haotian. Kyren Wilson made breaks of 76, 90 and 107 to defeat Luca Brecel 4–0. Reigning world champion Judd Trump defeated native Gibraltan Lee Prickman, Brazil's Igor Figueiredo and Englishman Martin O'Donnell to reach the quarter-finals. Joe Perry was defeated by Jimmy Robertson in the last 32, meaning he did not have enough ranking points to qualify for the following event, the 2020 Tour Championship.

The final four rounds, from the last 16 onwards, were all played on 15 March. Wilson defeated Fergal O'Brien on a  before winning over both Un-Nooh in the quarter-finals and Mark Williams in the semi-finals 4–0 each to reach the final. Trump defeated three Chinese players, Li Hang, Liang Wenbo and Xiao Guodong to meet Wilson in the final. The first frame of the best-of-seven frame final was won by Trump, who made a break of 125, with Wilson winning the second frame with a break of 115. Wilson won frame five, before Trump made his third century break of the final, a 123 to force a deciding frame. In winning the event, Trump gained enough prize money to win the BetVictor European Series, earning a bonus of £150,000. This was also Trump's sixth ranking event win of the season, the most in a single season of any player. Trump commented: "To win six ranking titles in a season, something which no one else has ever done, is an amazing achievement for me... I wasn't thinking about that tonight until it got to 3–3."

Main draw
Below is the full draw for the event. Players in bold denote match winners.

Top half

Section 1

Section 2

Section 3

Section 4

Bottom half

Section 5

Section 6

Section 7

Section 8

Finals

Final

Qualifying
Qualifying for the event featuring amateur players took place in Gibraltar on 11 and 12 March 2020. There were a total of four rounds with all matches being played as the best-of-5 frames.

Round 1

Round 2

Round 3

Round 4

Century breaks

Main stage centuries
A total of 63 century breaks were made during the tournament. Judd Trump made the highest break of the event, a 144, in frame three of the final against Kyren Wilson.

 144, 132, 125, 123, 123, 113, 111, 104, 103  Judd Trump
 143  Jack Lisowski
 141, 104  Tom Ford
 139, 137, 127  Fergal O'Brien
 139  Sam Craigie
 138, 101  Mark Selby
 137, 116  Ryan Day
 137, 101  Tian Pengfei
 136  Mitchell Mann
 133, 114, 113  Liang Wenbo
 129, 124  Chang Bingyu
 128  Thepchaiya Un-Nooh
 127, 110  Luca Brecel
 126, 125, 103  Elliot Slessor
 123, 118  Rod Lawler
 123, 116, 100, 100  Xiao Guodong
 122, 120  Zhao Xintong
 118  Zhou Yuelong
 115, 107  Kyren Wilson
 112  Ian Burns
 110, 109  Stuart Bingham
 110, 107, 106  Jimmy Robertson
 110  Michael Holt
 108, 107  Barry Hawkins
 108, 105  Mark Joyce
 105  Li Hang
 104, 103, 100  Lyu Haotian
 101  Igor Figueiredo
 101  Robbie Williams
 101  Yuan Sijun

References

2020
2020 in snooker
2020 in Gibraltarian sport
March 2020 sports events in Europe
Gibraltar Open